Kim Aas Christensen (born 15 June 1970) is a Danish politician and member of the Folketing, the national legislature. A Social Democrat, he has represented Funen since November 2022. He had previously been a substitute member of the Folketing for Tanja Larsson between October 2021 and January 2022.

Aas was born on 15 June 1970 in Faaborg. He is the son of foreman Gustav Aas Christensen and Margit Østergaard Christensen. He has a Bachelor of Arts degree in theology from Aarhus University (1999). He studied teaching at Skaarup Seminarium (2001-2005). He was a teacher (2005-2017), school co-ordinator (2017-2018) and a crime prevention consultant for Faaborg-Midtfyn Municipality (2018-2022). He was a member of the municipal council in Faaborg-Midtfyn Municipality from 2013 to 2022.

References

External links

1970 births
Aarhus University alumni
Danish municipal councillors
Danish schoolteachers
Living people
Members of the Folketing 2022–2026
People from Faaborg-Midtfyn Municipality
Social Democrats (Denmark) politicians